Marketing Metric Audit Protocol (MMAP)
 Memory map
 mmap, a UNIX system call for mapping files to memory
 Marked Markovian Arrival Process